Nick Garrett may refer to:

* Nick Garrett (bass-baritone) (born 1978), English songwriter, pianist, composer, and arranger
 Nick Garrett (TV character), fictional character on TV series October Road

See also
Nick Garratt, Australian rowing coach
 Nicky Garratt, guitarist with punk rock band U.K. Subs